Long Island was an island located in Chesapeake Bay, northwest of another former island, Holland Island.
The island was shown on maps up until near 1934, when erosion of nearby islands combined with the rising sea levels caused it to be submerged.

References

Islands of Maryland
Former islands of the United States
Chesapeake Bay watershed
1934 disestablishments in Maryland